Fink may refer to:

Name 

 Fink (surname), people and fictional characters with the surname
 Fink (singer), or Fin Greenall, English singer and songwriter
 Howard Finkel, also known as The Fink, professional wrestling announcer

Other uses 

 Fink (software), a collaborative computing project to port Unix programs to Mac OS X
 slang for an informant
 Fink, West Virginia, an unincorporated community 
 10891 Fink, an asteroid
 Fink (album), a 1989 album by the Swamp Zombies
 F*INK, a free weekly event guide in Dunedin, New Zealand
 Rat Fink, a cartoon character from "Kustom Kulture" hot rod detailing
 Fink, Texas, an unincorporated community

See also 
 Fink effect, a factor in medical anaesthesia
 Finks motorcycle club, an Australian outlaw motorcycle club
 Jim Finks (1927–1994), American sports executive